Julia G. Landauer (born November 12, 1991) is an American professional stock car racing driver and motivational speaker. She last competed part-time in the NASCAR Xfinity Series, driving the No. 45/44 Chevrolet Camaro for Alpha Prime Racing. She has also raced in the NASCAR K&N Pro Series West, driving for Bill McAnally Racing and Sunrise Ford Racing, and in 2016 became the highest-finishing female ever in the season-long points tally, finishing fourth.

In 2013, she was a contestant on Survivor: Caramoan, the 26th season of the CBS reality show Survivor.

Racing career

Landauer began racing go-karts at age 10, and found success with many wins and podiums. At 13, Landauer moved to racing cars and the following year became the first female champion of a Skip Barber Racing Series, scoring 12 wins. After racing in Formula BMW USA single-seaters, she gained her first oval-racing experience in Ford Focus Midgets. Landauer then transitioned to late model stock cars, but ran into funding issues. While in college, she competed part-time in late models and Legends cars.

Having caught the attention of owner Bill McAnally in 2009, Landauer competed for his Bill McAnally Racing team in select Late Model races that year, running in the Whelen All-American Series Late Model division at All American Speedway. In 2015 at the Motor Mile Speedway, Landauer competed for Lee Pulliam Performance, winning the All-American Series-sanctioned Limited Late Model track championship, the first female track champion in that division, and the first female track champion since Sheryl Carls in 2011. She also competed in the track's Limited Sportsman division, winning in her debut.

For 2016, Landauer was selected by McAnally and his business partner, record executive and former Lieutenant Governor of California Mike Curb, to drive for a fourth team in the K&N Pro Series West. Behind the wheel of the No. 54 Toyota Camry, she finished eighth in her debut at Irwindale Speedway, going on to record 7 top-5 finishes and 13 top-10s in 14 races, for which she was honored with the 2016 Driver Achievement Award and named the series's Top Breakthrough Driver. During the course of the season, she was also invited to be a part of the NASCAR Next program, the only female in the 2016 class.

In 2018, Landauer secured three races with CBRT in the NASCAR Pinty's Series. The following year, she became the first woman to lead a lap in the Pinty's Series.

In 2020, Landauer joined PK Carsport for a full-time NASCAR Whelen Euro Series EuroNASCAR 2 campaign.

In 2022, Landauer raced in the Xfinity Series for Alpha Prime Racing starting with the July 16th race at New Hampshire Motor Speedway. Landauer then raced on October 22nd at Homestead Miami Speedway with the sponsorship from ATEM Car Club.

Personal life
Landauer graduated from Manhattan's Stuyvesant High School in 2010. In 2014, she attained a bachelor's degree in science, technology, and society from Stanford University. Landauer has also been a motivational speaker at events like TEDx. In 2017, she was named to Forbes magazine's 30 Under 30 list for sports.

Landauer first gained national exposure as a contestant on the twenty-sixth season of Survivor (2013), reaching Day 19 before she was voted out (the eighth contestant to be eliminated). She is originally from New York City, and has since moved to Charlotte, North Carolina, where most NASCAR teams are based.

Motorsports career results

NASCAR
(key) (Bold – Pole position awarded by qualifying time. Italics – Pole position earned by points standings or practice time. * – Most laps led.)

Xfinity Series

K&N Pro Series East

K&N Pro Series West

Pinty's Series

 Season still in progress
 Ineligible for series points

References

External links
 
 

American motivational speakers
Women motivational speakers
NASCAR drivers
Living people
American female racing drivers
Survivor (American TV series) contestants
Stanford University alumni
Stuyvesant High School alumni
1991 births
21st-century American women